Mount Koum is a mountain of northern Gabon. It lies 1 kilometre from Kuniassi, and 32 kilometres from Oyem towards Bilam.

References

Mountains of Gabon